Elise van Sas (born ) is a Belgian volleyball player. She is part of the Belgium women's national volleyball team.

She competed at the 2018 FIVB Volleyball Women's Nations League, 
On club level she plays for VC Oudegem.

Clubs

References

External links 

 http://www.volleyball.world/en/women/teams/bel-belgium/players/elise-van-sas?id=64414
 http://volleymagazine.be/tag/elise-van-sas/
 https://www.cev.eu/Competition-Area/PlayerDetails.aspx?TeamID=8503&PlayerID=45988&ID=699

1997 births
Living people
Belgian women's volleyball players
Place of birth missing (living people)
Setters (volleyball)
21st-century Belgian women